The Men's solo free routine competition of the 2022 European Aquatics Championships was held on 14 August 2022.

It marked the first time male artistic swimmers competed in a solo free routine at a LEN European Aquatics Championships and the second solo event open to men, following the solo technical routine two days earlier.

Results
The final was held on 14 August at 10:30.

References

Artistic